Gyponini is a tribe of leafhoppers in the family Cicadellidae, formerly treated as a subfamily, but now considered to belong within the subfamily Iassinae. Gyponini includes about 60 genera and more than 1,300 described species, located in the Americas.

Genera

 Acuera DeLong & Freytag, 1972
 Acuponana DeLong & Freytag, 1970
 Acusana DeLong, 1942
 Acuthana Domahovski & Cavichioli, 2018
 Alapona DeLong, 1980
 Angucephala DeLong & Freytag, 1975
 Arapona DeLong, 1979
 Bahapona DeLong, 1977
 Barbatana Freytag, 1989
 Brevisana Freytag, 1987
 Caetana Domahovski, Gonçalves, Takiya & Cavichioli, 2019
 Carapona DeLong & Freytag, 1975
 Carnoseta DeLong, 1981
 Chilella DeLong & Freytag, 1967
 Chilenana DeLong & Freytag, 1967
 Chloronana DeLong & Freytag, 1964
 Clinonana Osborn, 1938
 Clinonella DeLong & Freytag, 1971
 Coelogypona DeLong & Freytag, 1966
 Costanana DeLong & Freytag, 1972
 Culumana DeLong & Freytag, 1972
 Curtara DeLong & Freytag, 1972
 Declivara DeLong & Freytag, 1971
 Doradana Metcalf, 1952
 Dragonana Ball & Reeves, 1927
 Dumorpha DeLong & Freytag, 1975
 Flexana DeLong & Freytag, 1971
 Folicana DeLong & Freytag, 1972
 Freytagana DeLong, 1975
 Fuminana Freytag, 1989
 Gypona Germar, 1821
 Gyponana Ball, 1920
 Gyponites Statz, 1950
 Hamana DeLong, 1942
 Hecalapona DeLong & Freytag, 1975
 Hirsutapona Freytag, 2013
 Hyperapona Freytag, 2013
 Insolitana Domahovski, Gonçalves, Takiya & Cavichioli, 2019
 Kalopona Freytag, 2015
 Largulara DeLong & Freytag, 1972
 Marganana DeLong, 1948
 Minimana Freytag, 1987
 Nancyana Freytag, 1990
 Negosiana Oman, 1949
 Nulapona DeLong, 1976
 Nullana Statz, 1950
 Oligogypona Statz, 1950
 Oligopenthimia Freytag, 2015
 Planipona DeLong, 1982
 Platypona DeLong, 1942
 Polana Ball, 1920
 Ponana DeLong & Freytag, 1969
 Ponanella Ball, 1920
 Prairiana DeLong & Freytag, 1975
 Proxima DeLong & Freytag, 1975
 Rectapona Domahovski & Cavichioli, 2018
 Regalana DeLong & Freytag, 1964
 Reticana Osborn, 1938
 Rhogosana DeLong, 1942
 Rugosana DeLong, 1942
 Sagaripona Gonçalves, Takiya & Mejdalani, 2017
 Sakakibarana Le Peletier & Serville, 1825
 Scaris DeLong, 1976
 Sordana DeLong & Freytag, 1966
 Spinanella DeLong, 1977
 Sulcana DeLong & Freytag, 1971
 Tenuacia Freytag, 2015
 Tuberana Freytag, 1989
 Versutapona DeLong, 1981
 Villosana DeLong & Freytag, 1963
 Woldana DeLong & Freytag, 1975
 Zonana DeLong & Freytag, 1972

References

Further reading

External links

 

Hemiptera tribes
Iassinae